Cabo Blanco may refer to:
 Cabo Blanco, Africa, a peninsula also known as Ras Nouadhibou
 Cabo Blanco, Peru, fishing village and surf spot
 Cabo Blanco, Spain, village in Arona, Spain
 Cabo Blanco, Chile, hamlet in Valdivia, Chile
 Cabo Blanco, Costa Rica, wildlife reserve
 Cabo Blanco (film), a film starring Charles Bronson

See also 
Cape Blanco (disambiguation)